The 2012 Dominion of Canada Northern Ontario Provincial Men's Curling Championship was held February 5–12 at the Soo Curlers Association in Sault Ste. Marie, Ontario.  The winning team of Brad Jacobs represented Northern Ontario at the 2012 Tim Hortons Brier in Saskatoon, Saskatchewan.

Teams

Standings

Results

Draw 1
February 5, 2:30 PM ET

Draw 2
February 5, 7:30 PM ET

Draw 3
February 6, 2:00 PM ET

Draw 4
February 6, 7:30 PM ET

Draw 5
February 7, 2:00 PM ET

Draw 6
February 7, 7:30 PM ET

Draw 7
February 8, 2:00 PM ET

Draw 8
February 8, 7:30 PM ET

Draw 9
February 9, 2:00 PM ET

Draw 10
February 9, 7:30 PM ET

Draw 11
February 10, 9:30 AM ET

Playoffs

3 vs. 4
February 10, 2:00 PM ET

1 vs. 2
February 10, 7:30 PM ET

Semifinal
February 11, 2:00 PM ET

Final
February 11, 7:30 PM ET

References

2012 Tim Hortons Brier
Sport in Sault Ste. Marie, Ontario
Curling in Northern Ontario
2012 in Ontario
February 2012 sports events in Canada